The communauté de communes Bourganeuf et Royère-de-Vassivière  was created on December 31, 1999 and is located in the Creuse département of the Limousin  region of central France. It was created in January 2000. It was merged into the new Communauté de communes Creuse Sud Ouest in January 2017.

Participants 
The communauté comprised the following 20 communes:

Auriat
Bosmoreau-les-Mines
Bourganeuf
Faux-Mazuras
Le Monteil-au-Vicomte
Mansat-la-Courrière
Masbaraud-Mérignat
Montboucher
Royère-de-Vassivière
Saint-Amand-Jartoudeix
Saint-Dizier-Leyrenne
Saint-Martin-Château
Saint-Martin-Sainte-Catherine
Saint-Moreil
Saint-Junien-la-Bregère
Saint-Pardoux-Morterolles
Saint-Pierre-Bellevue
Saint-Pierre-Chérignat
Saint-Priest-Palus
Soubrebost

Policies and objectives 
The policy and objectives of the communauté are economic development, improvement of habitat, preservation of natural heritage and enhancement of cultural heritage, maintaining and welcoming a changing population and economic activities. 
The communauté plans to restore the sites of the ‘’Martinèche’’, at Soubrebost, where Martin Nadaud was born and died. It is proposed to create a memorial space and visitors’ centre based on the life of Martin Nadaud. To this effect, a public subscription has been proposed. 
Placed under a forestry regime, the marsh will be managed by the National Forestry Office.

See also
Communes of the Creuse department

References 

Bourganeuf